The 3rd Caucasus Army Corps (Russian, 3-й Ка́вказский арме́йский ко́рпус) was a military formation of the Russian Empire which existed from 1912 to 1918.

Composition
21st Infantry Division
52nd Infantry Division
3rd Caucasus Cossack Division

Part of
3rd Army: 1914
12th Army: 1915
3rd Army: 1915–1916
3rd Army: 1917

Commanders
gen. of artillery Vladimir A. Irmanov: 1912–1917
lieutenant gen. M. N. Ivanov: 1917
lieutenant gen. książę A. N. Eristov: 1917

References
 A. K. Zalesskij I mirowaja wojna. Prawitieli i wojennaczalniki. wyd. WECZE Moskwa 2000.
 

Corps of the Russian Empire